Lisa M. Koonin is an American public health official and medical researcher associated with the development of social distancing as a strategy to prevent the spread of viral diseases. 

Dr. Lisa M. Koonin worked for over 30 years in the US government's Center for Disease Control and Prevention (CDC) and was involved in planning for and managing responses to national and international viral and natural disasters. During her career at CDC, she led the development of national pandemic preparedness plans and policies, conducted large-format exercises, and consulted with businesses, state and local governments, healthcare facilities, non-governmental organizations, academic institutions, and ministries of health around the world, to improve emergency preparedness. 

She is one of the public health leaders featured in Michael Lewis's new book, The Premonition. This author describes how Koonin, as part of a small team, developed pandemic “social distancing” measures, and the role that she played in developing the national policy that informed mitigation measures taken during the COVID-19 pandemic.

Dr. Koonin founded Health Preparedness Partners (HPP) after her career with CDC. HPP helps organizations in their response to the COVID-19 pandemic, monkeypox and other infectious disease threats, including providing practical and detailed guidance about determining when and how to return to the workplace, strategies for protecting employees and managing ongoing risk mitigation, and preparing for future waves of COVID-19, as well as other threats. In her role, Koonin also provides consultation to businesses and organizations as they update their business continuity and emergency response plans informed by lessons learned from the COVID-19 pandemic.

Education 
Koonin's degrees are in nursing (BSN, Western Carolina University, 1983; MN, Emory University, 1986), epidemiology (MPH, Emory University, 1986), and public health leadership/health policy and management (DrPH, University of North Carolina at Chapel Hill, 2013). She is an adjunct assistant professor in Public Health and Management at UNC-Chapel Hill's Gillings School of Global Public Health.

Professional areas of interest 
Koonin's publications range from early work on maternal mortality, teen pregnancy, and reproductive health issues in the first twenty years of her career to work on pandemics and emergency preparedness from 2008 on. Dr. Koonin is a frequent lecturer at national and international conferences on pandemic and infectious disease preparedness and response, and has published more than 95 peer-reviewed scientific publications on an array of public health and preparedness topics.

References

External links 

Living people
Year of birth missing (living people)
Western Carolina University alumni
Rollins School of Public Health alumni
UNC Gillings School of Global Public Health alumni
University of North Carolina at Chapel Hill faculty
American medical researchers
Women medical researchers
American company founders
American women company founders
21st-century American women